Lothar Berg (born 28 July 1930 in Stettin; died 27 July 2015 in Rostock) was a German mathematician and university teacher.

Work and life 
Lothar Berg graduated from high school in Neustrelitz in 1949 and then studied mathematics and physics at the University of Rostock. In 1953, he began a two-year postgraduate course at the University of Rostock. Lothar Berg then went to the Technical University of Electrical Engineering in Ilmenau as a senior assistant (from 1958 as university lecturer).

From 1959 to 1965 Berg was a professor of mathematics at the University of Halle. From 1965 until his retirement in 1996 he was professor of analysis at the University of Rostock. He accompanied a large number of young mathematicians in their research work. His students included the later university teachers Karl-Heinz Kutschke, Manfred Taschen,  and Dieter Schott.

In 1973, he received the University Medal of the University of Jyväskylä, Finland, and the Second University Prize by the University of Rostock in 1978 as well as the Ehrenmedaille of the Mathematische Gesellschaft der Deutschen Demokratischen Republik, Berlin, in 1990. In 2005, he received the Golden DMV Plaquette by the German Mathematical Society.

Lothar Berg has also been listed as a noteworthy mathematics educator by Marquis Who's Who.

Since 27 May 1952, he was married to a co-translator of various Russian math books into German, Christa Berg née Jahncke. They had two children.

Publications 
 . Berlin, 1962.
  (in  Vol. 66). Berlin, 1968.
 . Berlin, 1972.
 . Berlin, 1974.
 . Berlin, 1979.
 . Berlin, 1986.

Translations 
  aka "Ryzhik-Gradshteyn"
  aka "Smirnov"

See also 
 Gradshteyn and Ryzhik (GR)
 A Course in Higher Mathematics

References

Further reading 

 https://web.archive.org/web/20220123155634/http://cpr.uni-rostock.de/resolve/id/cpr_person_00001546?tab=documents
 https://web.archive.org/web/20220123155750/http://cpr.uni-rostock.de/file/cpr_person_00001546/cpr_derivate_00006483/berg_lothar_bib.pdf
 https://web.archive.org/web/20220122165247/http://cpr.uni-rostock.de/file/cpr_person_00001546/cpr_derivate_00001629/berg_lothar_pic.jpg
 https://web.archive.org/web/20170202002232/http://www.oz-trauer.de/danksagung/prof-dr-lothar/43432286

20th-century German mathematicians
21st-century German mathematicians
University of Rostock alumni
Academic staff of the University of Rostock
Members of the German Academy of Sciences Leopoldina